ATAFC may refer to one of the following English association football clubs:

 Almondsbury Town A.F.C.
 Ashton Town A.F.C.
 Alnwick Town A.F.C.

See also
 ATFC (disambiguation)